Madabhushi Ananthasayanam Ayyangar (4 February 1891 – 19 March 1978) was the first Deputy Speaker and then Speaker of the Lok Sabha in the Indian Parliament. He also served as the 5th Governor of Bihar.

He was born in Thiruchanoor, Tirupati district of Madras Presidency, British India.

He was teacher in Mathematics and later became a lawyer between 1915 -1950. Inspired by Mahatma Gandhi he participated actively in Indian Freedom Struggle and was jailed twice.

He was elected as member of Central Legislative Assembly in 1934. He was elected to the first Lok Sabha from Tirupathi and to the second Lok Sabha from Chittoor constituencies in 1952 and 1956 respectively.

He was elected in 1952 as the first Deputy Speaker of Lok Sabha with Ganesh Vasudev Mavalankar as the Speaker. After the death of Mavalankar in 1956, he was elected as Speaker of Lok Sabha. Dowry prohibition act 1961 was passed by joint session of parliament with M. A. Ayyangar as speaker. He worked as Governor of Bihar between 1962 and 1967.

A life size bronze statue of this celebrated statesman was erected at his hometown Tirupathi in 2007.

Personal life
M. A. Ayyangar was born on 4 February 1891 in the village of Thiruchanur, near the world-famous temple town Tirupati, in Tirupati district. His father was M. Venkatavaradhachariar. M. A. Ayyangar worked as mathematics Teacher in Pachaiyappa's College at Esplanade, Chennai. Ayyangar married Choodammal in 1919, with whom he had four sons and eight daughters.

References

External links
A short biography
Official biographical sketch in Parliament of India website

Telugu people
Speakers of the Lok Sabha
India MPs 1952–1957
India MPs 1957–1962
Members of the Central Legislative Assembly of India
1891 births
1978 deaths
Lok Sabha members from Andhra Pradesh
People from Chittoor district
Deputy Speakers of the Lok Sabha
People from Rayalaseema
Indian National Congress politicians from Andhra Pradesh
India MPs 1962–1967
Prisoners and detainees of British India
Andhra movement